The 2011–12 Northern Football League season was the 114th in the history of Northern Football League, a football competition in England.

Division One

Division One featured 19 clubs which competed in the division last season, along with three new clubs, promoted from Division Two:
 Guisborough Town
 Marske United
 Newton Aycliffe

Also, Stokesley changed back name to Stokesley Sports Club.

League table

Results

Division Two

Division Two featured 17 clubs which competed in the division last season, along with five new clubs.
Clubs relegated from Division One:
 Esh Winning
 Ryton, who also changed name to Ryton & Crawcrook Albion
 West Allotment Celtic
Plus:
 Alnwick Town, promoted from the Northern Football Alliance
 Easington Colliery, promoted from the Wearside Football League

League table

Results

References

External links
 Northern Football League official site

Northern Football League seasons
9